Samuel Freiherr von Brukenthal (26 July 1721, in Leschkirch – 9 April 1803, in Sibiu) was the Habsburg governor of the Grand Principality of Transylvania between 6 July 1774 and 9 January 1787. He was a personal advisor of Empress Maria Theresa.

His home, a large palace in Sibiu, is home to the Brukenthal National Museum, formed around the collections he gathered, and expanded from a public exhibit first opened in 1817.

Life

Samuel von Brukenthal was born on 26 July 1721 in Leschkirch (Nocrich), between Hermannstadt (Sibiu) and Agnetheln (Agnita). His grandfather and father had been royal judges. The family's original name was Brekner. Samuel von Brukenthal's father, Michael Brekner, was ennobled in 1724, receiving the noble name von Brukenthal. His mother, Susanna, was part of the aristocratic family of Conrad von Heydendorff.

Brukenthal Palace of Sibiu

Brukenthal started the construction of his town palace in Hermannstadt (Sibiu) a year after being elected Governor of Transylvania (1777). The major difficulty in the construction of the "new house" consisted in the obligation to keep to the two demolished lots, adjacent to the Jesuit church and seminary. Unlike palaces surrounded by parks, the edifices built in the interior of the medieval towns are strictly limited to the existence of the initial lots. The palace built by Samuel von Brukenthal has a rectangular foundation, enclosing an inner courtyard. The access to the palace and to the courtyard is made through a portal situated in the axis of the narrow side, towards the front of the street.

The Brukenthal Palace represents one of the Baroque treasures of Central Europe. The construction of this imposing edifice had no other purpose, from the very beginning, than the creation of a propitious background for the conservation of an art collection and of antiquities having an inestimable value.

Legacy

 Summer palace and park in Freck (Avrig)
 Palace in Untermühlenderf (Sâmbăta de Jos), built in Baroque style by Samuel von Brukenthal in 1750-60. It has a large Lipizzaner stud farm established by Count Johannes von Brukenthal in 1874.
 Brukenthal Gymnasium
The palace is not the only public building of Sibiu named after him, there is also a school which is situated near the palace, right across from the Protestant Cathedral of Sibiu. The Samuel von Brukenthal Gymnasium is the oldest German school in Romania. The school was mentioned the first time in 1380. The present building was erected in the 18th century. The Samuel von Brukenthal Gymnasium is a school with instruction in the language of the German minority.  The school is still one of the best schools in the country. The language of instruction is still German; Romanian is taught as the country's official language. After the turn of the twentieth century and the exodus of the Transylvanian Saxons, the majority of students are Romanians.

References 

1721 births
1803 deaths
18th-century Austrian people
Austrian art collectors
German art collectors
18th-century art collectors
Transylvanian Saxon people
Barons of the Holy Roman Empire
People from Sibiu County